1984 (For the Love of Big Brother) is a soundtrack album by the British pop duo Eurythmics. Released on 12 November 1984 by Virgin Records, it was the duo's fourth album overall and contains music recorded by Eurythmics for the film Nineteen Eighty-Four, based on George Orwell's dystopian novel of the same name. Virgin Films produced the film for release in its namesake year, and commissioned Eurythmics to compose a soundtrack.

Background

Recording
Band members Annie Lennox and Dave Stewart worked purely as a duo for these recordings, with no contributions from other musicians. The music continued in the predominantly electronic style that Eurythmics had found great success with since 1983, but was far more experimental with several tracks being instrumentals and some (most notably the hit single "Sexcrime") employing the use of sampling. Stewart himself described some tracks as "Kraftwerk meets African tribal meets Booker T and the MGs."

Unknown to the group, Michael Radford, the film's director, had commissioned his own orchestral score and was not fond of Eurythmics' work. Two versions of the film were released, one featuring Eurythmics' music, and the "director's cut", which replaced most of Eurythmics' music by the orchestral score. When accepting an award for the film, Radford publicly complained of having Eurythmics' music "foisted" on him. Eurythmics issued a statement saying that they had accepted Virgin's commission in good faith, and would never have done so if they had known that it was not being done with the director's approval.

Musical concept
Most of the tracks are instrumental, with song titles and lyrics being derived from Orwell's text. For instance, "I Did It Just The Same" is taken from a passage in the book where the protagonist, Winston Smith, relates how he committed "sexcrime" with a prostitute—initially deceived by her makeup, when he got close to her, he realised she was "about fifty—but I did it just the same". "Julia" was the name of Winston's lover. "Sexcrime" and "Doubleplusgood" are examples of Newspeak, the revised version of the English language spoken in Orwell's story. The track "Doubleplusgood" features a female announcer—the voice of the omnipresent Telescreen in the movie—reading out various memos which Winston had received at his job in the Ministry of Truth, where his role was to amend past and present newspaper articles so that they conformed to current Party dogma. The "Ministry of Love" was the government police and torture department, and included "Room 101", a room which contained "the worst thing in the world"—i.e. where each torture victim would be confronted with their own worst nightmare.

Release
The album was released by Virgin Records in the UK and RCA Records in the US. Two singles were released from the album, "Sexcrime (Nineteen Eighty-Four)" and "Julia". The first was a top-10 hit in most territories, while the largely a capella track "Julia" achieved little commercial success and broke the duo's run of six consecutive top-10 singles in the UK when it peaked at number 44. Promotional videos were produced for both singles.

One US LP release had an additional sticker that stated "Censored by the thought police" (although the music was the same).

Track listing

Personnel
Credits adapted from the liner notes of 1984 (For the Love of Big Brother).

 David A. Stewart – production, mixing
 Eric "ET" Thorngren – engineering, mixing
 Sean Burrows – engineering assistance
 Steven Stanley – early recording engineering 
 Sarah Quill – front cover photo
 Howard Brown – 1984 logo
 Mighty – sleeve

Charts

Weekly charts

Year-end charts

Certifications

References

1984 soundtrack albums
Albums produced by David A. Stewart
Eurythmics soundtracks
Music based on Nineteen Eighty-Four
Science fiction film soundtracks
Virgin Records soundtracks